The Aviatik C.VIII was a prototype German observation aircraft built by Aviatik in World War I.

Design
The C.VIII was a development of the C.VII with the former's BMW IV engine replaced by the simpler Benz Bz.IV. It was an aerodynamically clean biplane with a minimum amount of biplane box struts and a cut-out in the upper wing to improve visibility from the cockpit. Like the Halberstadt CL.II, the Aviatik C.VIII had a plywood-covered fuselage tapering down to a narrow tail. 

The Aviatik C.VIII was judged obsolete in 1917 given the deployment of an observer in front of the pilot.

Specifications

References

Further reading

External links

1910s German military reconnaissance aircraft
C.VIII
Single-engined tractor aircraft
Biplanes
Aircraft first flown in 1917